Kill the Poker Player is a 1972 Italian western film directed by Mario Bianchi and starred by Robert Woods, Ivano Staccioli and Nieves Navarro. It was composed by Carlo Savina and screenplayed by Mario Bianchi, Paola Bianchini and Luis G de Blain.

Cast

References

External links
 

Italian Western (genre) films
Films shot in Rome
Films shot in Madrid
Films directed by Mario Bianchi
Films scored by Carlo Savina
1972 Western (genre) films
1972 films
1970s Italian films